The European Flight Test Safety Award was created after the fatal accident of test pilot Gérard Guillaumaud by his fiancée Heidi Biermeier. The regulations of the award state that recipients must be individuals who made significant contributions in the area of safety within flight testing.

Award Ceremony 
The award was first granted in October 2007 in London at the award dinner concluding the 1st European Flight Test Safety Workshops. The workshop is hosted by the Flight Test Safety Committee of Society of Experimental Test Pilots (SETP) and of Society of Flight Test Engineers (SFTE).  The recipient is nominated by a jury, consisting of two flight test experts and the founder of the award, Ms. Heidi Biermeier.

Recipients 
 2007 Dipl.-Ing. Dr.-Ing. Dieter W. Reisinger, MSc (Austrian Airlines)
 2008 Gérard Temme of CertiFlyer B.V.
 2009 Patrick L. Svatek, (Flight test engineer at NAVAIR, now USNTPS Patuxent River)
 2010 Billie Flynn, (Experimental Test Pilot) Lockheed Martin, 
 2011 General (retired.) Desmond Barker (CSIR), author of the book Zero Error Margin - Airshow Display Flying Analyzed
 2012 Capt. David C. Carbaugh, chief pilot, Boeing Flight Operations Safety
 2013 Maurice "Moe" Girard, senior engineering test pilot, Bombardier
 2014 Gulfstream
 2015 Daniel Schwenzel (Airbus Helicopters)

Workshop Locations and Theme 

 2007 London
 2008 Amsterdam
 2009 Vienna, "First Flight"
 2010 London
 2011 Salzburg, "Displaying Prototype Aircraft - Risks and Preparation"
 2012 Salzburg, "Loss of Control - Tackling Aviation's #1 Killer"
 2013 Amsterdam, "Human Machine Interface and Flight Deck Design"
 2014 Manching, "Safety Management Systems in Flight Test Organizations"
 2015 Aix-en-Provence, "Finding the Black Swan"

There is also an annual North American Flight Test Safety Workshop.

See also

 List of aviation awards

References

External links
 Website Flight Test Safety Committee
 Flight Test Safety Workshop 2009 in Vienna
 Flight Test Safety Workshop, May 2010 in San Jose, California
 Flight Test Safety Workshop 2011 in Salzburg
 Society of Experimental Test Pilots

Aerospace engineering
Aviation safety
Aviation awards